The following is a list of notable deaths in September 2010.

Entries for each day are listed alphabetically by surname. A typical entry lists information in the following sequence:
 Name, age, country of citizenship at birth, subsequent country of citizenship (if applicable), reason for notability, cause of death (if known), and reference.

September 2010

1
Tomás Pedro Barbosa da Silva Nunes, 67, Portuguese Roman Catholic prelate, Auxiliary Bishop of Lisboa (since 1998).
Sir Colville Barclay, 97, British painter and botanist.
Robert B. Cutler, 96, American Olympic rower.
Wakanohana Kanji I, 82, Japanese sumo wrestler, kidney cancer.
Cammie King, 76, American actress (Gone with the Wind), lung cancer.
Don Lang, 95, American baseball player, after long illness.
Jean Nelissen, 74, Dutch cycling journalist.

2
Roland Arpin, 76, Canadian educator, communicator, and public administrator, Parkinson's disease.
Trevor Beard, 90, Australian physician.
Germán Dehesa, 66, Mexican journalist, writer and announcer, cancer. (Spanish)
Shmuel Eisenstadt, 86, Israeli sociologist.
Bob Loveless, 81, American knife maker and manufacturer.
Eileen Nearne, 89, British Special Operations Executive agent in World War II, heart attack. (body discovered on this date)
*Pedro Marcos Ribeiro da Costa, 88, Angolan Roman Catholic prelate, Bishop of Saurímo (1977–1997).
Jackie Sinclair, 67, Scottish footballer (Dunfermline Athletic, Newcastle United), cancer.
Leo Trepp, 97, German-born American rabbi, last surviving German rabbinical witness to the Holocaust.
Morgan White, 86, American actor and children's television host.

3
Larry Ashmead, 78, American book editor.
Micky Burn, 97, British writer and poet.
David Bushnell, 86, American historian, expert on Colombia, cancer. (Spanish)
Mike Edwards, 62, English cellist (Electric Light Orchestra), traffic collision.
Noah Howard, 67, American jazz saxophonist.
Dušan Lukášik, 78, Czech Olympic basketball player.
Robert Schimmel, 60, American stand-up comedian (The Howard Stern Show), traffic collision.
Sir Cyril Smith, 82, British politician, Member of Parliament for Rochdale (1972–1992).
José Augusto Torres, 71, Portuguese football player and coach, Alzheimer's disease.

4
Oleksandra Bandura, 92, Ukrainian teacher and literature scholar.
Francis Gerard Brooks, 86, Northern Irish Roman Catholic prelate, Bishop of Dromore (1976–1999).
Paul Conrad, 86, American Pulitzer Prize-winning political cartoonist (Los Angeles Times).
John Gouriet, 75, British political campaigner (The Freedom Association) and author.
Kálmán Kulcsár, 82, Hungarian jurist and politician, Minister of Justice (1988–1990).

5
 Hedley Beare, 77, Australian education leader.
Corneille Guillaume Beverloo, 88, Dutch artist.
David Dortort, 93, American television producer and writer (Bonanza, The High Chaparral).
Ludvig Eikaas, 89, Norwegian artist. 
Elizabeth Jenkins, 104, English author.
Lewis Nkosi, 73, South African writer.
Homi Sethna, 86, Indian nuclear scientist and chemical engineer.
R. Smith Simpson, 103, American Foreign Service Officer.
Abdul Mannan Syed, 67, Bangladeshi poet.
Jefferson Thomas, 67, American civil rights pioneer, member of the Little Rock Nine, pancreatic cancer.
Shoya Tomizawa, 19, Japanese Moto2 motorcycle racer, race crash.
Angelo Vassallo, 56, Italian politician, Mayor of Pollica, shot.

6
Clive Donner, 84, British film director (The Caretaker, What's New Pussycat?), Alzheimer's disease.
Bob Jencks, 69, American football player (Chicago Bears), heart attack.
John McKellar, 80, Australian comedy writer.
Yvonne O'Neill, 74, Canadian politician, MPP for Ottawa–Rideau (1987–1995), cancer.

7
Claude Béchard, 41, Canadian politician, MNA for Kamouraska-Témiscouata (1997–2010), cancer.
Eberhard von Brauchitsch, 83, German industrial manager, suicide.
Klaus Feldt, 98, German World War II Korvettenkapitän (corvette captain).
Amar Garibović, 19, Serbian Olympic cross-country skier, traffic collision. 
William H. Goetzmann, 80, American historian.
Barbara Holland, 77, American author, lung cancer.
Jack Kershaw, 96, American attorney who represented James Earl Ray.
John Kluge, 95, German-born American entrepreneur and billionaire, richest person in the United States (1989–1990).
Brendan Lyons, 83, Australian politician, member of the Tasmanian House of Assembly for Bass (1982–1986).
Riad al-Saray, 35, Iraqi television presenter, shot.
Joaquín Soler Serrano, 91, Spanish journalist, Alzheimer's disease. 
Glenn Shadix, 58, American actor (Beetlejuice, The Nightmare Before Christmas, Heathers), injuries sustained in a fall.
Wilebaldo Solano, 94, Spanish communist activist during the Spanish Civil War. 
Lucius Walker, 80, American pastor, heart attack.

8
Wazir Agha, 88, Pakistani Urdu language writer, poet, critic and essayist.
Jenny Alpha, 100, Martinique-born French actress and singer. (French)
Hadley Caliman, 78, American jazz saxophonist, liver cancer.
Rich Cronin, 36, American pop singer and songwriter (LFO), stroke related to acute myelogenous leukemia.
Allen Dale June, 91, American original Navajo code talker.
Thomas Guinzburg, 84, American editor, co-creator and co-founder of The Paris Review, complications from heart bypass surgery.
Safah Abdul Hameed, Iraqi journalist, shot.
Bernice Lapp, 92, American Olympic bronze medal-winning (1936) swimmer.
Murali, 46, Indian Tamil actor, heart attack.
Irwin Silber, 84, American writer and journalist, complications of Alzheimer's disease.
Israel Tal, 86, Israeli general.
George C. Williams, 84, American evolutionary biologist, Parkinson's disease.

9
Gene Case, 72, American advertising executive, heart attack.
Heriberto Correa Yepes, 94, Colombian Vicar Apostolic of Buenaventura (1973–1996). (Spanish)
Lennie von Graevenitz, 75, South African boxer.
Bent Larsen, 75, Danish chess grandmaster.
Rauno Mäkinen, 79, Finnish wrestler and Olympic gold medalist. 
Venu Nagavally, 61, Indian actor and screenwriter. 
Eddie Phillips, 80, American baseball player (St. Louis Cardinals).
Mary Richard, 70, Canadian aboriginal activist and politician.
Riccardo Sarfatti, 70, Italian businessman, traffic collision. 
Kamilla Składanowska, 62, Polish Olympic fencer.
Frank Wanlass, 77, American electrical engineer.

10
Margaret Auld, 78, Scottish nurse.
Juan Mari Brás, 82, Puerto Rican independence advocate.
Gizela Dali, 70, Greek actress, cancer. 
Willian Lara, 53, Venezuelan journalist and politician, Governor of Guárico, drowned.
Fridrikh Maryutin, 85, Russian Olympic footballer. 
Billie Mae Richards, 88, Canadian voice actress (The Care Bears Movie, Rudolph the Red-Nosed Reindeer, Rudolph's Shiny New Year), stroke.
Andrei Timoshenko, 41, Russian football player. 
Edwin Charles Tubb, 90, British science fiction author.
Ron Walters, 72, American scholar and civil rights activist, cancer.

11
Opal Wilcox Barron, 95, American First Lady of West Virginia (1961–1965).
Thomas Bingham, Baron Bingham of Cornhill, 76, British judge and Law Lord, cancer.
Bärbel Bohley, 65, German artist and opposition figure, lung cancer.
Hugh Clark, 86, British army officer.
King Coleman, 78, American rhythm and blues singer ("Do the Mashed Potatoes"), heart failure.
Harold Gould, 86, American actor (The Sting, Rhoda, The Golden Girls), prostate cancer.
Gunnar Hoffsten, 86, Swedish jazz musician. 
Ron Kramer, 75, American football player (Green Bay Packers, Detroit Lions), heart attack.
Kevin McCarthy, 96, American actor (Invasion of the Body Snatchers), natural causes.
Fathi Osman, 82, Egyptian author, heart failure.
Taavi Peetre, 27, Estonian shot putter, drowning.
Diego Rodríguez Cano, 22, Uruguayan footballer (Club Nacional de Football), traffic collision. (Spanish)
Mike Shaw, 53, American professional wrestler, heart attack.
Kei Tani, 78, Japanese comedian.

12
Charles Ansbacher, 67, American conductor.
Nduka Anyanwu, 30, Nigerian footballer.
Val Belcher, 56, American-born Canadian football player (Ottawa Rough Riders), heart failure.
Pietro Calabrese, 66, Italian journalist (Il Messaggero, La Gazzetta dello Sport, Panorama), lung cancer. 
Claude Chabrol, 80, French film director (Madame Bovary, Story of Women).
 Kalman J. Cohen, 77–78, American economist.
 Honor Frost, 92, British underwater archaeologist.
Günter Heßelmann, 85, German Olympic athlete.
Varnette Honeywood, 59, American painter, cancer.
Argiris Kavidas, 34, Greek actor (Strella), cardiac arrest. 
La Fiera, 49, Mexican professional wrestler, stabbed. (Spanish)
Wesley Duke Lee, 78, Brazilian visual artist, heart failure.
Judith Merkle Riley, 68, American professor and author, ovarian cancer.
Swarnalatha, 37, Indian playback singer, lung infection.
Joe Tarnowski, 88, Polish-born Scottish electronics engineer and intelligence officer.
 Andrew Witkin, 58, American computer engineer.

13
John Arundel Barnes, 92, Australian-born British social anthropologist.
Stan Gooch, 78, British psychologist.
Don Goodson, 77, English cricketer (Leicestershire).
Lorne Greenaway, 77, Canadian politician, MP for Cariboo—Chilcotin (1979–1988), amyotrophic lateral sclerosis.
Jim Greenwood, 81, Scottish rugby player.
Robert W. McCollum, 85, American virologist, made discoveries relating to polio and hepatitis, heart failure.
Robert Rompre, 81, American ice hockey player.
Barbara B. Smith, 88, American religious leader, pulmonary fibrosis.
Gus Williams, 73, Australian Aboriginal leader and country music singer.

14
Mohammed Arkoun, 82, Algerian-born French Islamic philosopher, professor at Sorbonne.
Caterina Boratto, 95, Italian film actress.
Sir James Cleminson, 89, British soldier and businessman.
Ralph T. Coe, 81, American art museum director and Native American advocate, natural causes.
Gennadi Gerasimov, 80, Russian diplomat, Soviet Ambassador to Portugal (1990–1995). 
José Janene, 55, Brazilian politician involved in Mensalão scandal, septic shock. (Portuguese)
Frederick Jelinek, 77, Czech-born American speech recognition researcher.
Paulo Machado de Carvalho Filho, 86, Brazilian businessman, founder of Jovem Pan Radio. (Portuguese)
Francis Mansour Zayek, 89, American Maronite Catholic prelate, founding Archbishop of Saint Maron of Brooklyn.
Dodge Morgan, 78, American businessman, fourth person in history to circumnavigate globe alone, cancer.
Francisco Ribeiro, 45, Portuguese musician (Madredeus), liver cancer. 
Nicholas Selby, 85, British actor.
Kálmán Tolnai, 85, Hungarian Olympic sailor.
James E. Winner Jr., 81, American entrepreneur, inventor of The Club, traffic collision.

15
Arrow, 60, Montserratian soca musician ("Hot Hot Hot"), complications from brain cancer.
Angidi Chettiar, 82, Mauritian politician, President (2002) and Vice President (1997–2002; since 2007).
Bettie Cilliers-Barnard, 95, South African artist, natural causes.
Frank Jarvis, 70, British character actor (The Italian Job, A Bridge Too Far).
Alvin Krenzler, 89, American judge and real estate developer.
Al LaMacchia, 89, American baseball player (St. Louis Browns) and executive, stroke.
Richard Livsey, Baron Livsey of Talgarth, 75, British politician, MP for Brecon and Radnorshire (1985–1992; 1997–2001).
Erkki Rönnholm, 86, Finnish Olympic athlete.
Peter Stebler, 83, Swiss Olympic silver medal-winning (1948) rower.
Guido Turchi, 93, Italian composer.

16
Victor Adibe Chikwe, 72, Nigerian Roman Catholic prelate, first Bishop of Ahiara (since 1988).
Berni Collas, 56, Belgian politician, Senator (since 2007).
James Dillion, 81, American Olympic bronze medal-winning (1952) discus thrower.
Helen Escobedo, 76, Mexican artist and sculptor, cancer. (Spanish)
Imran Farooq, 50, Pakistani politician (1992–2010), stabbed.
Friedrich Wilhelm, Prince of Hohenzollern, 86, German Head of the House of Hohenzollern-Sigmaringen (since 1965). 
John D. Goeken, 80, American entrepreneur, founder of MCI Communications, cancer.
Tsvetan Golomeev, 49, Bulgarian Olympic swimmer.
Keiju Kobayashi, 86, Japanese actor, heart failure.
Mickey Mangham, 71, American football player.
George N. Parks, 57, American college band director (University of Massachusetts Amherst), heart attack.
Mario Rodríguez Cobos, 72, Argentine politician, writer and religious leader.
Jack Sullivan, 75, American basketball player and labor lobbyist, septic shock.
Jim Towers, 77, English football player (Brentford). 
Wayne Twitchell, 62, American baseball player (Milwaukee Brewers, New York Mets), cancer.
Hans Wagner, 87, Austrian ice hockey player.
Robert J. White, 84, American neurosurgeon.

17
Robert Babington, 90, British politician, member of the House of Commons of Northern Ireland for North Down (1969–1972).
Gloria Colón, 79, Puerto Rican Olympic fencer.
Sergio Di Stefano, 71, Italian actor and voice actor, heart attack.
Puttaraj Gawai, 96, Indian Hindustani singer.
Whitey Grant, 94, American guitarist (Whitey and Hogan).
András Harangvölgyi, 86, Hungarian Olympic skier.
Bill Littlejohn, 96, American animator (Tom and Jerry, Peanuts), natural causes.
Jean-Marcel Jeanneney, 99, French politician, Minister of Justice (1969). 
Louis Marks, 82, British script writer and producer.
Vojteh Ravnikar, 67, Slovenian architect.
Noble Threewitt, 99, American racehorse trainer.
Robert Truax, 93, American Navy captain and rocket engineer, prostate cancer.
Wayne Winterrowd, 68, American gardening expert, heart failure.

18
Mohamed Abul-Khair, 34, Saudi Arabian terrorist, drone strike.
James Bacon, 96, American author, journalist and actor (Escape from the Planet of the Apes, Meteor), heart failure.
Øystein Gåre, 56, Norwegian football coach (Bodø/Glimt, Norway U21), after short illness. 
Aubrey Jackman, 89, British army officer, hotelier and military tattoo producer.
Jill Johnston, 81, American lesbian feminist and writer, stroke.
Egon Klepsch, 80, German politician, President of the European Parliament (1992–1994). 
Sam Kooistra, 75, American Olympic water polo player.
Will Renfro, 78, American football player (Washington Redskins), complications following heart surgery.
Mohinder Singh Pujji, 92, Indian fighter pilot, Squadron Leader (World War II), stroke.
Irving Schwartz, 81, Canadian businessman.
Bobby Smith, 77, English footballer (Chelsea, Tottenham Hotspur).
Inge Steensland, 86, Norwegian resistance leader and shipping magnate, complications from a stroke. 
Ingjald Ørbeck Sørheim, 73, Norwegian jurist and politician, complications from a stroke. 
Wallace Turner, 89, American Pulitzer Prize-winning reporter (The Oregonian).
Austin Volk, 91, American politician and historian, Mayor of Englewood, New Jersey (1960–1963, 1966–1968).
Walter Womacka, 84, German painter.

19
Dan Arbeid, 82, English studio potter.
Howard Brodie, 94, American courtroom sketch artist.
Ray Coleman, 88, American baseball player (Browns, Philadelphia A's, White Sox).
Buddy Collette, 89, American jazz saxophonist.
Bob Crossley, 98, British abstract artist.
Edward Fenlon, 106, American judge.
Sergey Gomonov, 49, Soviet and Belarusian footballer and coach. (Russian)
José de Jesús Gudiño Pelayo, 67, Mexican jurist, associate justice of the Supreme Court of Justice of the Nation, heart attack. (Spanish)
Stoo Hample, 84, American cartoonist (Inside Woody Allen), cancer.
Chrysostomos II Kioussis, 89, Greek Archbishop of Athens and of all Greece (Old Calendarists).
Ivan Kirkov, 78, Bulgarian painter, lung cancer. 
José Antonio Labordeta, 75, Spanish songwriter, professor, writer, presenter and politician. 
László Polgár, 63, Hungarian opera singer, Grammy Award winner.
Irving Ravetch, 89, American Academy Award-nominated screenwriter (Hud, Norma Rae), pneumonia.
Max Salazar, 78, American author on Latin jazz.
Murray Sayle, 84, Australian journalist and war correspondent, Parkinson's disease.
Bouk Schellingerhoudt, 91, Dutch cyclist.

20
Jack Cassini, 90, American baseball player.
Fud Leclerc, 86, Belgian singer, first person to score nul points at the Eurovision Song Contest.(Dutch)
Jakob Mayr, 86, Austrian Roman Catholic prelate, Auxiliary Bishop Emeritus of Salzburg. (German)
Kenny McKinley, 23, American football player (Denver Broncos), suicide by gunshot.
Al Pilarcik, 80, American baseball player (Kansas City Athletics, Baltimore Orioles and Chicago White Sox).
Jennifer Rardin, 45, American author, known for the Jaz Parks series of fantasy novels.
Leonard Skinner, 77, American school teacher, namesake of Lynyrd Skynyrd, Alzheimer's disease.
Kenneth Weaver, 94, American science writer (National Geographic Magazine).

21
Carlos Abumohor, 89, Chilean businessman and investor.
Sam Bailey, 86, American football, basketball, and baseball coach.
Grace Bradley, 97, American actress (The Big Broadcast of 1938), widow of William Boyd.
Geoffrey Burgon, 69, British composer.
John Crawford, 90, American actor (The Poseidon Adventure, The Towering Inferno, The Waltons), stroke.
Wes Davoren, 82, Australian politician, member of the New South Wales Legislative Assembly for Lakemba (1984–1995).
Vinnie Doyle, 72, Irish journalist, editor of the Irish Independent, after short illness.
Mickey Freeman, 93, American comedian and television actor (The Phil Silvers Show).
Bernard Genoud, 68, Swiss Roman Catholic prelate, Bishop of Lausanne, Genève et Fribourg (1999–2010), lung cancer.
Sindi Hawkins, 52, Canadian politician, MLA for Okanagan West (1996–2001) and Kelowna-Mission (2001–2009), leukemia.
Jerrold E. Marsden, 68, Canadian mathematician.
James Edward Michaels, 84, American Roman Catholic prelate, Auxiliary Bishop Emeritus of Wheeling-Charleston (1973–1987)
Sandra Mondaini, 79, Italian actress, after long illness.
Kenneth North, 80, American Air Force general.
Don Partridge, 68, British musician and one-man band, heart attack.
Shabtai Rosenne, 93, Israeli jurist and diplomat, cardiac arrest.
Sir Archie Taioroa, 73, New Zealand Maori leader, stroke.
Rual Yarbrough, 80, American banjo player, pulmonary fibrosis.

22
Jack A. Adams, 88, American engineering psychologist, cancer.
Jackie Burroughs, 71, English-born Canadian actress (Road to Avonlea, The Care Bears Movie, Willard), stomach cancer.
Ray Bussard, 82, American swimming coach, member of the International Swimming Hall of Fame.
Mike Celizic, 62, American sportswriter and author, T-cell lymphoma.
Tyler Clementi, 18, American college student and cyberbullying victim, suicide by jumping.
Apostolos Dimelis, 88, Greek Hierarch in Patriarchate of Constantinople, Metropolitan of Rhodes (1988–2004).
Don Doll, 84, American football player and assistant coach (Detroit Lions).
Eddie Fisher, 82, American singer and entertainer, complications from hip surgery.
Eleuterio Francesco Fortino, 72, Italian Archimandrite of the Italo-Albanian Catholic Church (Eparchy of Lungro), Under Secretary of PCPCU (since 1987).
Bruno Giorgi, 69, Italian football player and manager.
Jorge González, 44, Argentine basketball player and professional wrestler, complications from diabetes.
Graeme Hunt, 58, New Zealand journalist.
Bridget O'Connor, 49, British playwright and screenwriter (Tinker Tailor Soldier Spy), cancer.
Alan Rudkin, 68, British boxing champion.
Van Snowden, 71, American puppeteer (Child's Play, H.R. Pufnstuf, Tales from the Crypt), cancer.
Víctor Julio Suárez Rojas, 57, Colombian guerrilla (FARC), air strike.
Vyacheslav Tsaryov, 39, Russian football player. 
James Tunney, 83, Canadian dairy farmer and politician, Senator from Ontario (2001–2002).

23
Alfred Ahner, 88, American officer.
William Andres, 85, Canadian politician and farmer.
Malcolm Douglas, 69, Australian bushman and documentary maker, traffic collision.
Arthur Holch, 86, American Emmy Award-winning television director and producer, heart failure.
Gerald S. Lesser, 84, American psychologist, chief advisor to Sesame Street, cerebral hemorrhage.
Teresa Lewis, 41, American convicted murderer, execution by lethal injection.
Clinton Manges, 87, American football team owner (San Antonio Gunslingers) and oil tycoon, cancer.
Fernando Riera, 90, Chilean football player and coach, heart attack.
Bob Shaw, 77, American baseball player (Chicago White Sox), liver cancer.
K. B. Tilak, 84, Indian independence activist and director, after long illness.
Catherine Walker, 65, British fashion designer, cancer.

24
 George Ballis, 85, American photographer, cancer.
 Dick Griffey, 71, American record executive, founder of SOLAR Records, complications from heart surgery.
 William Harrison, 75, American obstetrician, leukemia.
 Oswalt Kolle, 81, German sex educator.
 Anneliese Küppers, 81, German equestrian.
 Olga C. Nardone, 89, American actress (The Wizard of Oz).
 Gilda O'Neill, 59, British novelist and historian, side effects of medication.
 Jure Robič, 45, Slovenian cyclist, five-time winner of the Race Across America, traffic collision.
 Santiago Salfate, 94, Chilean footballer.
 Gennady Yanayev, 73, Russian politician, Vice President of the USSR (1990–1991), nominal head of GKChP (1991), lung cancer.

25
 Aleksandra Artyomenko, 82, Soviet Olympic skier.
Sir Vincent Floissac, 82, Saint Lucian jurist and politician, Governor-General of Saint Lucia (1987–1988), cancer.
Art Gilmore, 98, American actor and voice actor, President of AFTRA (1961–1963), natural causes.
Arne Isacsson, 93, Swedish painter. 
Delbert Lamb, 95, American Olympic speed skater (1936, 1948), Alzheimer's disease.
Zoltán Pálkovács, 29, Slovak Olympic judoka, traffic collision. 
Sir Donald Tebbit, 90, British diplomat.
Karlo Umek, 93, Slovenian Olympic shooter.

26
 Victor Calvo, 86, American politician, California State Assemblyman (1974–1980), Mayor of Mountain View, California, prostate cancer.
 Stanley Chais, 84, American investor involved in Madoff investment scandal, blood disorder.
 Johnny Edgecombe, 77, British jazz promoter, inadvertently alerted authorities to the Profumo affair, lung cancer.
 Stan Heath, 83, American football player (Green Bay Packers) and CFL player (Calgary Stampeders), throat cancer.
 Jimi Heselden, 62, British businessman, owner of Hesco Bastion and Segway, drove Segway off a cliff.
 Patrick Lee, 79, Canadian Anglican prelate, Bishop of Rupert's Land (1994–1999).
 Terry Newton, 31, British rugby league player, apparent suicide by hanging.
 Arjun Kumar Sengupta, 73, Indian politician.
 James Stovall, 52, American stage actor.
 Gloria Stuart, 100, American film actress (The Invisible Man, Titanic), respiratory failure.

27
Ernesto Álvarez, 82, Argentine and Chilean football player.
Carmelo Arden Quin, 97, Uruguayan poet, painter and sculptor.
George Blanda, 83, American Hall of Fame football player (Chicago Bears, Houston Oilers, Oakland Raiders).
Dieudonné Cédor, 85, Haitian painter. (French)
Michael Gizzi, 61, American poet.
Pierre Guffroy, 84, French film production designer and art director. 
 Lê Sáng, 90, Vietnamese martial arts master, long illness.
 Ahmed Maher, 75, Egyptian politician, Minister of Foreign Affairs (2001–2004).
Kenny Marino, 66, American actor (Death Wish 3, Prince of the City).
Sally Menke, 56, American film editor (Inglourious Basterds, Kill Bill, Pulp Fiction), suspected heat exhaustion.
Carlos Mercader, 87, Uruguayan Olympic modern pentathlete.
Buddy Morrow, 91, American jazz musician and bandleader.
Elliot Philipp, 95, British obstetrician and gynaecologist.
Real Quiet, 15, American thoroughbred racehorse, winner of 1998 Kentucky Derby and Preakness Stakes, broken neck following a fall.
Trevor Taylor, 73, British racing driver, cancer.
Frank Turner, 87, British Olympic gymnast.
Ed Wiley Jr., 80, American jazz and R&B saxophonist and singer, injury from a fall.

28
Kurt Albert, 56, German climber, climbing accident.
Muhammad Kazim Allahyar, Afghan politician, suicide attack.
Lilia Amarfi, 60, Soviet and Russian operetta actress, after serious illness.
Norman Atkins, 76, Canadian political strategist and politician, senator from Ontario (1986–2009).
Orvin Cabrera, 33, Honduran footballer (national team), liver cancer. (Spanish)
Héctor Croxatto, 102, Chilean scientist. (Spanish)
John Daukom, 72/73, Malaysian Olympic sprinter.
Sir Trevor Holdsworth, 83, British businessman.
Arthur Penn, 88, American film director and producer (Bonnie and Clyde, The Missouri Breaks), heart failure.
Józef Rubiś, 79, Polish Olympic skier.
Gisèle Vallerey, 80, French Olympic swimmer.
Dolores Wilson, 82, American opera singer, natural causes.
Romina Yan, 36, Argentine actress (Chiquititas), cardiac arrest.
Tadeusz Zagajewski, 97, Polish electronics engineer and scientist.

29
Andy Albeck, 89, American film executive, President of United Artists (1978–1981), heart failure.
Richard Abruzzo, 47, American balloonist.
Georges Charpak, 86, Polish-born French physicist, Nobel laureate.
Vincenzo Crocitti, 61, Italian actor (An Average Little Man). 
Tony Curtis, 85, American actor (Some Like It Hot, Spartacus, The Defiant Ones), cardiac arrest.
Carol Rymer Davis, 65, American balloonist.
Herm Fuetsch, 92, American basketball player (Baltimore Bullets).
Greg Giraldo, 44, American comedian (Friday Night Stand-Up with Greg Giraldo), accidental prescription drug overdose.
Clifford B. Hicks, 90, American writer and editor (Popular Mechanics, Alvin Fernald series).
Voki Kostić, 79, Serbian composer. 
Armindo Lopes Coelho, 78, Portuguese Roman Catholic prelate, Bishop of Porto (1997–2007).
Sherman J. Maisel, 92, American government official, Federal Reserve governor, respiratory failure.
Joe Mantell, 94, American character actor (Marty, Chinatown, The Twilight Zone), pneumonia.
David Marques, 77, British rugby union player, cancer.
Nick Nicholson, 84, American college football coach.
Mary Rundle, 103, British government official, superintendent in the Women's Royal Naval Service.
Rao Sikandar Iqbal, 67, Pakistani politician, Defense Minister (2002–2007).

30
Mohamed Aden Sheikh, 73–74,  Somali medical doctor and politician.
Oscar Avogadro, 59, Italian lyricist.
Stephen J. Cannell, 69, American TV producer and writer (The A-Team, The Rockford Files, 21 Jump Street), complications from melanoma.
Ed Henry, 89, American politician and academic, Mayor of St. Cloud, Minnesota (1964–1970).
Martin Ljung, 93, Swedish actor and comedian.
Sir Robert Mark, 93, British police officer, Commissioner of the Metropolitan Police (1972–1977).
Aaron-Carl Ragland, 37, American electronic dance musician, lymphoma.
Tor Richter, 72, Norwegian Olympic shooter.
Joseph Sobran, 64, American political writer, diabetes.
Tony Thibodeaux, 72, American cajun musician.

References

2010-09
 09